Mauritius is an island nation in the Indian Ocean.

Mauritius may also refer to:

Places
 Mauritius (1968–1992), an independent state, the predecessor to the modern-day Mauritius
 British Mauritius (1810-1968), a former British Crown Colony

People
 Mauritius (given name)
 Saint Maurice or Mauritius (died c. 287), Egyptian leader of the Theban Legion martyred for refusing to attack fellow Christians
 Mauritius (Dean of Armagh), Dean in 1238

Other uses
 , a Royal Navy light cruiser constructed in the Second World War
 Mauritius (1612), a Dutch wooden-hulled sailing ship
 , a radio station in Mauritius from 1962 to 1975
 45617 Mauritius, a British LMS Jubilee Class locomotive
 Mauritius (play), a 2007 Broadway play
 Mauritius Open, a golf tournament played on the island from 1994 through 2008
 Mauritius International, an annual badminton tournament
 Mauritius (typeface), a 1967 type produced by C.E. Weber